Margarete Stokowski (born April 14, 1986 in Zabrze, Poland) is a Polish-German writer and essayist. She is best known for her weekly essays for the magazine Spiegel Online where she writes about the current state of feminism in Germany. The numbers of clicks on her essays reach up to 900,000. The Süddeutsche Zeitung stated that she is the "loudest voice of German feminism" in 2019.

Stokowski advocates freedom for every gender and often criticizes the neo liberal economy for the oppression of women especially, but also men. According to her views, the modern German society often misleads women into buying goods they don't need or being unhappy with their own bodies by setting up impossible-to-reach beauty standards. She states that a non-patriarchal world would be better for everybody and sees the fear of losing power as the main motivation for some people to cling on to patriarchy. Stokowski is a sharp observer and critic of right-wing tendencies all over the world.

As of July 2019, Stokowski has published two books off her own, namely Untenrum frei (Freedom "Down There") in 2016 and Die letzten Tage des Patriarchats (The last days of patriarchy) in 2018. Both works were very successful and reached high positions in the bestseller rankings.

In September 2019, Stokowski was awarded the Kurt-Tucholsky-Preis for her critical analysis in her columns.

Personal life
Stokowski was born in Poland but moved to Germany with her family at the age of two. She grew up in the Neukölln neighborhood of Berlin, attended a Catholic private school, and then studied philosophy and social sciences at Humboldt University. She lives in Berlin. After contracting COVID-19 in early 2022, she was diagnosed with long COVID.

References

1986 births
German feminists
German women essayists
Polish feminists
Polish women essayists
Polish essayists
Feminist theorists
German people of Polish descent
Living people
Der Spiegel people
People from Zabrze